Northern (constituency) may refer to: 

 Northern constituency (Dagestan)
 Northern constituency (Saint Petersburg)
 Northern constituency (Zambia)

See also 

 Constituency